Life Is Life may refer to:
 "Life Is Life" (song), a 2011 song by Noah and the Whale
 "Live Is Life", a 1984 song by Opus, covered by Laibach as "Life Is Life"
 Life Is Life (film), a 2003 Israeli independent underground dramatic art film

See also
 Live Is Life (film), 2021 film directed by Dani de la Torre